Belize competed at the 2018 Summer Youth Olympics, in Buenos Aires, Argentina from October 6th to 18th.

The Belize team consisted of two athletes in two sports, athletics and table tennis. This marked the country's Youth Olympics debut in table tennis. Breann Young was selected to be the country's flag bearer at the opening ceremony.

Competitors
The following is the list of number of competitors participating at the Games per sport/discipline.

Athletics (track and field)

Belize received one wild card to send one girl.

Table tennis

Belize received a wild card spot to send a boy athlete.

Singles

Team

See also
Belize at the 2018 Commonwealth Games
Belize at the 2019 Pan American Games

References

2018 in Belizean sport
Nations at the 2018 Summer Youth Olympics
Belize at the Youth Olympics